Lac de Gravelle is a lake in Paris, France. At an elevation of 70 m, its surface area is 0.01 km².

Gravelle
Landforms of Paris